Eric Magennis (born 1937/1938) is an Australian Paralympic lawn bowls player and archer. He first represented Australia in lawn bowls at the 1970 Commonwealth Paraplegic Games in Edinburgh, where he won a pairs gold medal . At the 1972 Heidelberg Paralympics, he participated in archery and became the first Australian to win a gold medal in the lawn bowls Men's Singles event. He won two further Paralympic gold medals, one with Bruce Thwaite at the 1976 Toronto Games in the Men's Pairs wh event and the other with Roy Fowler at the 1984 New York/Stoke Mandeville Games in the Men's Pairs paraplegic event. He retired from international competition in 1986, having won 78 out of the 85 games which he played over his 16-year career.

He also participated in able-bodied competition, notably as part of a team that reached the final of the 1979 New South Wales State Fours Championship. He is affectionately nicknamed "Wheels" in the bowling community. As of 1991, he was working as a lawn bowls coach in the Sydney suburb of Riverstone and throughout New South Wales. He also competed in national championships in archery, weightlifting, table tennis and pistol and rifle shooting.

References

Paralympic archers of Australia
Paralympic lawn bowls players of Australia
Australian male archers
Australian male bowls players
Archers at the 1972 Summer Paralympics
Lawn bowls players at the 1972 Summer Paralympics
Lawn bowls players at the 1976 Summer Paralympics
Lawn bowls players at the 1984 Summer Paralympics
Medalists at the 1972 Summer Paralympics
Medalists at the 1976 Summer Paralympics
Medalists at the 1984 Summer Paralympics
Wheelchair category Paralympic competitors
Paralympic gold medalists for Australia
Paralympic medalists in lawn bowls
People with paraplegia
Sportsmen from New South Wales
1930s births
Living people